Bhaag Bakool Bhaag is an Indian Hindi-language sitcom. It starred Jay Soni as the titular character with Hiba Nawab and Shruti Rawat.

Plot
The sitcom is about Bakool who lives two lives. One in a Rural avatar and other in Urban. What has got him in trouble is he has two wives in his two lives. Soon, there is a leap of one month and it is shown that both Jigna and Sheena (Bakool's wives) are pregnant with his children. Kokila and Ranjeet are overjoyed. Eventually, everything is revealed in front of everyone and all the characters realize that Bakul was a victim of circumstances and not a fraudster. The show culminates with Bakool feeding both his wives, thereby helping them in completing the rituals of their respective fasts, and both the parties accepting Bakool.

Cast
Jay Soni as Bakool "Dhollu" Vasavda
Hiba Nawab as Sheena Vasavda
Shruti Rawat as Jigna Vasavda
Purvi Vyas as Kokilaben Vasavda
Navin Bawa as Ranjeet
Feroz as Ramlal / Dugdoo
Hardik Sangani as Harry Upadhyay
Sohit Vijay Soni as Ghanta Panwala

Guests
Hina Khan as herself, for the promotion of Khatron Ke Khiladi Season 8
Nia Sharma as herself, for the promotion of Khatron Ke Khiladi Season 8
Ravi Dubey as himself, for the promotion of Khatron Ke Khiladi Season 8
Rakhi Sawant as Twinke Maa

References

2017 Indian television series debuts
Hindi-language television shows
Indian television soap operas
Indian drama television series
Television shows set in Mumbai
Colors TV original programming
2017 Indian television series endings